Esco may refer to the following people:
Given name or nickname
Esco Sarkkinen (1918–1998), American football player and coach
 Nas (born 1973), nicknamed Esco, American rapper
 EscoLIVE (born 1990), an American hip-hop record producer

Middle name
Sigmund Esco Jackson (born 1951), American singer and musician
William Esco Moerner (born 1953), American physical chemist and chemical physicist 

Surname
 Lina Esco (born 1985), American actress